Srđan Šajn (Serbian Cyrillic: Срђан Шајн, ; born 28 March 1963) is a Serbian politician. He is the leader of one of Romani parties in Serbia, Roma Party. He was first elected to the Serbian Parliament in January 2007, one of only two deputies specifically representing the Romani constituency.

References 

Living people
Serbian Romani people
Romani politicians
1963 births
Roma Party politicians